Garab (also Romanized as Garāb and Garrāb; also known as Garmāb) is a village in Shahid Modarres Rural District, in the Central District of Shushtar County, Khuzestan Province, Iran. At the 2006 census, its population was 189, in 38 families.

References 

Populated places in Shushtar County